Thomas Carrique may refer to:

 Thomas Carrique (police officer), Canadian police commissioner
 Thomas Carrique (footballer) (born 1999), French footballer